Kathiraveli or கதிரவெளி (Paddy Field in Tamil)  is a town in Batticaloa District, Sri Lanka. It is located about 75 km Northwest of Batticaloa.

See also

Vakarai Bombing

References

Towns in Batticaloa District
Koralaipattu North DS Division